Umaslan or Umastan may refer to:
 Umaslan-e Olya
 Umaslan-e Sofla